Simeon Melanson (April 14, 1873 – August 22, 1964) was a Canadian politician. He served in the Legislative Assembly of New Brunswick as member of the Liberal party from 1935 to 1939.

References

1873 births
1964 deaths
20th-century Canadian politicians
New Brunswick Liberal Association MLAs